Nancy Durrant is a British journalist. Since February 2020 she has been the Arts Editor of the Evening Standard in London; previously she worked as art critic and arts commissioning editor for The Times. She has presented on the BBC Culture Show, contributed to Channel 4 News, Sky News, The Today Programme, Times Radio and LBC, and writes, programmes and presents Cultural Capital, a ten-minute weekly culture programme on the Evening Standard's YouTube channel. She has been a judge for the Catlin Art Prize and Sky Arts Ignition Futures Fund. She is referenced in the Rose Wylie painting PV Windows & Floorboards 2011, featured in the film by Adolfo Doring.
A terracotta portrait by Jon Edgar was exhibited at Yorkshire Sculpture Park in 2013 as part of the Sculpture Series Heads  exhibition. The sitting was documented in The Times.

References

Film
Nancy Durrant review of 2010 Bold Tendencies Sculpture Exhibition 
Nancy Durrant on Robert Hughes; Channel4 News 7.8.12
Nancy Durrant/Julian Spalding/Jon Snow on Damien Hirst; Channel4 News 28.3.12

Living people
English art critics
Place of birth missing (living people)
Year of birth missing (living people)
English journalists
The Times journalists